The 1973–74 Weber State Wildcats men's basketball team represented Weber State College during the 1973–74 NCAA Division I basketball season. Members of the Big Sky Conference, the Wildcats were led by third-year head coach Gene Visscher and played their home games on campus at Wildcat Gym in Ogden, Utah. They were 14–12 overall and 8–6 in conference play.

In the previous six seasons, the Wildcats had won the conference title and advanced to the NCAA tournament; their next appearance was in 1978.

Sophomore forward Jimmie Watts was named to the all-conference team; senior forward Steve Fleming was honorable mention.

References

External links
Sports Reference – Weber State Wildcats: 1973–74 basketball season
2015–16 Media Guide: 1973–74 season

Weber State Wildcats men's basketball seasons
Weber State